On 14 October 2022, the British tabloid newspaper the Daily Star began a livestream of an iceberg lettuce next to a framed photograph of Liz Truss, then recently appointed prime minister of the United Kingdom. This followed an opinion piece in The Economist that compared the expected brevity of Truss's premiership to the shelf life of a lettuce, with the October 2022 United Kingdom government crisis occurring just weeks into her tenure and leading many political commentators to opine that Truss's resignation would be imminent. She announced her resignation as prime minister on 20 October 2022, before the lettuce had wilted; the Daily Star subsequently declared the lettuce "victorious" over Truss.

Background
Liz Truss became Prime Minister of the United Kingdom on 6 September 2022, following the July–September 2022 Conservative Party leadership election, replacing Boris Johnson. The September 2022 United Kingdom mini-budget was published on 23 September by Kwasi Kwarteng, Chancellor of the Exchequer, which included tax cuts without matching spending cuts. The mini-budget triggered a heavily negative market reaction, with the exchange rate of the pound sterling collapsing and pension funds coming close to bankruptcy.

After just over a month in office, Kwarteng was removed as Chancellor of the Exchequer on 14 October, and Truss reversed most of the economic policies within the mini-budget. British media outlets lambasted Truss's performance and the ensuing political chaos, with many observers believing that her resignation would be imminent. An 11 October column in The Economist titled "Liz Truss has made Britain a riskier bet for bond investors" stated that, after deducting the ten-day mourning period for Queen Elizabeth II's death, Truss had caused economic and political turmoil after just seven days in power, comparing that duration to the "shelf-life of a lettuce". The publication further dubbed her the "Iceberg Lady", in contrast with the "Iron Lady", a nickname for the former British prime minister Margaret Thatcher, a political idol of Truss's. The lettuce comparison was made by The Economist executive editor Andrew Palmer.

The lettuce
Denis Mann, a deputy editor of the British entertainment-focused tabloid newspaper the Daily Star, read the column in The Economist and on 14 October mentioned it to Jon Clark, the newspaper's chief editor, who saw potential in the idea. On the same day, the Daily Star video team began broadcasting a livestream of an iceberg lettuce next to a framed photograph of Truss, asking the audience whether Truss would be able to outlast the lettuce.

The Daily Star hosted the livestream with the title "LIVE: Can Liz Truss outlast a lettuce?" on YouTube. The outlet had been known to make light of contemporary political events, such as Brexit, while generally not adopting a particular political stance. The lettuce had been purchased from a Tesco store for £0.60 with an expected shelf-life of approximately ten days, and was physically hosted in the home of Edward Keeble, one of the newspaper's video editors. Within the first five hours of the stream, it had received more than 50,000 likes, and attracted more than 350,000 viewers by the following day. 

On 18 October 2022, the Daily Star further ran a headline titled "Lettuce Liz on Leaf Support" (a pun on "life support"). As the livestream continued, a pair of googly eyes and a blonde wig were put on the lettuce, followed by fake feet and hands and glasses. Additionally, some crackers and a mug (labelled "Keep Calm and Carry On") were placed around the lettuce.

Before the lettuce had wilted, on 20 October, Truss announced her resignation as prime minister, becoming the shortest-serving prime minister in British history. At that moment, there were 12,000 viewers on the livestream, which soon shot up to 21,000. The British national anthem "God Save the King" began to play, the portrait of Truss on the table was flipped face down, and a plastic golden crown was placed on top of the lettuce, with the Daily Star declaring the lettuce's "victory" over Truss. The music was later changed to "Celebration" by American band Kool & the Gang, with a Greggs sausage roll and a glass of prosecco also featured. While the lettuce had not rotted entirely, it did show signs of discolouration, with a column in The Atlantic commenting that it was still usable in a salad. By the evening of Truss's resignation, the livestream had received more than 1.7 million viewers. An image of the lettuce was projected onto the Palace of Westminster the same evening, followed by a Daily Star tweet stating that the lettuce "has made it to parliament".

Reactions

Prior to Truss's resignation 
The comparison of Truss to the lettuce was received with humour by global media, with The Washington Post writing that Truss had become "the butt of quintessentially British jokes". The lettuce also became subject to betting, with bookmakers who had been previously contacted by Daily Star staff placing Truss's chances of survival past the lettuce as low; on 17 October, a £9 bet at Ladbrokes of the lettuce lasting longer would yield a £13 payout.

Post-resignation 

After Truss's resignation, the Daily Star released on 20 October a headline titled "Lettuce wins as Liz Leafs", and on 21 October published a "historic souvenir edition" headlined "Lettuce rejoice". Bookmaker Paddy Power offered odds of 500-to-1 that the lettuce would become the next prime minister. The Daily Star featured the lettuce on Cameo, allowing users to receive a personalized message "by the lettuce" for £13, with part of the proceeds going to charity. 

Labour Party MP Chris Bryant remarked during an appearance at Sky News that "the lettuce might as well be running the country", a statement echoed by The Atlantic journalist Helen Lewis. Former Russian President Dmitry Medvedev posted a tongue-in-cheek tweet congratulating the lettuce after Truss resigned. Several corporations such as Lidl and Deliveroo posted lettuce-related jokes capitalising on the livestream. In Truss's successor Rishi Sunak's first Prime Minister's Questions, Leader of the Opposition Sir Keir Starmer stated that Sunak lost the first leadership contest to Truss, who herself was "beaten by a lettuce".

Clark remarked in an interview that the staff at the Daily Star "have no plans to eat Lizzy Lettuce".

The Edenbridge Bonfire Society burnt an effigy of Truss and a laughing lettuce on a bonfire on Guy Fawkes Night, 2022. The box also contained a copy of her mini-budget, a T-shirt with the slogan "I am a fighter, not a quitter" (referencing a quote by Truss at her last Prime Minister's Questions), and a £115,000 cheque representing the maximum annual amount that all former prime ministers are entitled to claim under the Public Duty Costs Allowance scheme for expenses incurred performing the public duties associated with being a former prime minister and a leaving card. The box itself had a large letter "U" together with the words "This Way Up" written on it, both upside-down, along with "Oh Dear Oh Dear Oh Dear Packaging Ltd", referencing the greeting of Truss by Charles III at one of her royal audiences.

On 9 November, during Prime Minister's Questions, a Labour backbench MP shouted "bring the lettuce back!"

Similar actions 
On 14 October, Channel 5 presenter Jeremy Vine began a similar livestream of a lettuce being compared to Truss's tenure. Brands including easyJet and Sekonda ran advertising campaigns making fun of Truss's tenure.

On 14 November, following the audience of ITV celebrity reality show I'm a Celebrity...Get Me Out of Here! choosing contestant and MP Matt Hancock to be the camp leader, presenters Ant & Dec introduced a lettuce called Spud, again asking which would last longer.

During the 2023 Speaker of the United States House of Representatives election, the Lincoln Project made a tweet referencing the Liz Truss lettuce to mock Kevin McCarthy, who had failed to secure enough votes to win the Speakership.

See also 
 Out of the Blue, a biography of Truss that had to be rewritten because she resigned before its publication.
 Plant epithet, a name used to label a person or group by association with some perceived quality of a plant.

References

2022 establishments in the United Kingdom
British political satire
Daily Star (United Kingdom)
Fruit and vegetable characters
Individual plants
Internet memes introduced in 2022
Lettuce
Livestreams
Lettuce
October 2022 events in the United Kingdom
Political Internet memes
Product expiration
Publicity stunts